The East-Tarkosalinskoye gas field is a natural gas field located in the Yamalo-Nenets Autonomous Okrug. It was discovered in 1971 and developed by and Novatek. It began production in 1994 and produces natural gas and condensates. The total proven reserves of the East-Tarkosalinskoye gas field are around 7.013 trillion cubic feet (198×109m³), and production is slated to be around 1.23 billion cubic feet/day (34.8×105m³) in 2010.

References

Natural gas fields in Russia
Natural gas fields in the Soviet Union